Pouteria cinnamomea is a species of plant in the family Sapotaceae. It is endemic to Peru.

References

Trees of Peru
cinnamomea
Critically endangered plants
Taxonomy articles created by Polbot
Taxa named by Charles Baehni
Taxa named by Ludwig Diels